The Reminiscencias dance club shooting was a mass murder that occurred in Bogotá, Colombia on June 24, 2000, when 26-year-old Juan de Jesús Lozano Velásquez, accompanied by his friends Henry Orozco Casas and Julián Andrés Barbosa, fired an Uzi machine gun at revelers at the Reminiscencias dance club, after a friend of his asked them for help in case of a possible fight after a young woman refused to dance with him earlier. Velásquez killed eleven people, including Barbosa (by accident), wounded seven others, and then escaped with Orozco Casas, but was eventually arrested in Spain several months later, extradited back, and sentenced to 40 years in prison.

Victims
Carlos Arturo Aristizábal, 34, owner of the bar
Ricardo Javier Ariza Gil, 28
Rafael María Avila Barrios, 53
Julián Andrés Barbosa González, 22 (accomplice of Lozano Velásquez) 
Juan Carlos Bedoya, 27
Nelson Orlando Castro, 22
Néstor Alberto Granada, 28
Marta Liliana Londoño Castro, 32
Consuelo Patricia Menjura, 41
Javier Darío Moreno Millán, 35
John Jairo Ospina, 24, nephew of Carlos Aristizábal

Those wounded were: Rodrigo Aristizábal, 39, Jhon Jairo Bedoya, 34, Camilo José Moreno, 22, Kelly Fernanda Ospina Orozco, 20, Oscar Iván Ospina, 19, Arley Pinzón, 29, Fabián Alberto Granada, 36.

See also
 List of rampage killers in the Americas

References

External links
Eleven killed in Bogota disco, BBC (June 24, 2000)
A juicio presuntos responsables de masacre en el bar Reminiscencias , Boletín de Prensa No. 147
Los sicarios abren sucursal en Madrid, Belt Iberica (November 3, 2002)
Buscan a homicida que mató a once personas en un bar de Bogotá , critica.com.pa
40 Años Por Masacre En Bar, El Tiempo (August 29, 2003)

Massacres in Colombia
Mass murder in 2000
Deaths by firearm in Colombia
20th century in Bogotá
2000 in Colombia
2000 murders in Colombia
Events in Bogotá